The solar eclipse of January 4, 2011 was a partial eclipse of the Sun that was visible after sunrise over most of Europe, northwestern and South Asia.  It ended at sunset over eastern Asia. It was visible as a minor partial eclipse over northern Africa and the Arabian peninsula. The eclipse belonged to Saros 151 and was number 14 of 72 eclipses in the series.

Greatest eclipse occurred at 08:51 UTC in northern Sweden where the eclipse in the horizon had a magnitude of 0.858. At that time, the axis of the Moon's shadow passed a mere 510 km above Earth's surface.

A solar eclipse occurs when the Moon passes between Earth and the Sun, thereby totally or partly obscuring the image of the Sun for a viewer on Earth. A partial solar eclipse occurs in the polar regions of the Earth when the center of the Moon's shadow misses the Earth.
This was the first of four partial solar eclipses in 2011, with the others occurring on June 1, 2011, July 1, 2011, and November 25, 2011.

It also precedes the two total lunar eclipses occurring on June 15, 2011 and December 10, 2011.

Visibility

Animated path

Photo gallery

Related eclipses

Eclipses of 2011 
 A partial solar eclipse on January 4.
 A partial solar eclipse on June 1.
 A total lunar eclipse on June 15.
 A partial solar eclipse on July 1.
 A partial solar eclipse on November 25.
 A total lunar eclipse on December 10.

It was preceded two weeks earlier by the total lunar eclipse of December 21, 2010.

Solar eclipses 2008–2011

Metonic series

Notes

References

NASA Chart PDF

External links

Live web-cast of the Partial Solar Eclipse of 2011 Jan 04  Bareket observatory, Israel
Solar eclipse of 2011 January 4. Russia, Moscow. 4 Photos
 APOD 1/5/2011 , 1/6/2011 , 1/7/2011 
 SpaceWeather.com Solar eclipse gallery On Jan. 4, 2011
 Solar Eclipse from spain

2011 01 04

2011 in science
2011 01 04
Articles containing video clips
January 2011 events